KICX may refer to:

 KICX-FM 96.1, a radio station in McCook, Nebraska, United States
 CICS-FM 91.7, a radio station in Sudbury, Ontario, Canada that uses "KICX" as a branding